Timothy Jason Plato (born 14 October 1967) is a British racing driver who last competed in the British Touring Car Championship (BTCC) for BTC Racing. He has twice been BTCC Champion, in 2001 for Vauxhall and 2010 for Silverline Chevrolet. He has finished in the top 3 in the Championship 12 times and holds the record for the most overall race wins in the BTCC. He is also a presenter on the motoring television series Fifth Gear from 2004 to present.

Career history
After success in karting including a 1989 British Championship win in the Junior TKM Class, Oxford-born Plato raced in Formula Three and Formula Renault. In 1996, he entered the Renault Spider championship, taking a dominant title win.

BTCC (1997–2001)

Williams Renault (1997–1999)
In 1997, he gained the second drive in the Williams-Renault BTCC team, after Frank Williams organised a test between him, Gianni Morbidelli and Jean-Christophe Boullion with the fastest getting the contract offer. After being overlooked by Williams, Plato travelled to the Williams base and after some convincing, Sir Frank gave Plato the drive.

Plato took pole for his first three races in the Renault Laguna, and ultimately won 2 races as a rookie, taking 3rd in the championship which was won by his team-mate Alain Menu. He was 5th in the series in each of the next two years.

Vauxhall (2000–2001)

Plato joined Vauxhall in 2000, again taking 5th place in the championship. For 2001 the series had a new set of reduced-cost rules, fewer big-name drivers as a result, and Vauxhall had by far the best car. In a contentious and hard-fought season, Plato won the championship after team-mate Yvan Muller's car caught fire at the last round.

ASCAR and Break from BTCC (2002–2003)
With an ambition to get into NASCAR racing, Plato moved to the British ASCAR stock car scene in 2002, finishing third in the championship for XCEL Motorsport Ford Taurus.

In 2003, he was a driver coach for SEAT, returning to the BTCC with the Spanish team in 2004.

BTCC return (2004–present)

SEAT (2004–2008)

He was employed by SEAT to help with their driver development in 2003, and when they entered a BTCC team in 2004, he was the natural choice to lead the team. However the new SEAT Toledo needed developing if it were to become a race winner. Despite the development work needed, the car proved to be a winner right from the start, with Plato going on to win more races than any other driver (seven in total), finishing third overall in the championship. The regulations for 2004 meant that the driver who finished 10th in the first of the meeting's 3 races had pole (and a light car) for race 2, and the winner of race 2 had pole for race 3 (although with a now-heavier car). As a result of this, the championship rules were changed to reversing the top 10 of the race 3 grid, putting an end to this tactic, and the pace of Matt Neal's Team Dynamics Honda and Yvan Muller's Vauxhall left Plato unable to challenge for a second title in 2005. He finished 4th in the 2005 championship with only three wins to his credit during the season, with the team now run by Northern South.

For 2006, Plato continued in the British Touring Car Championship as lead driver for SEAT and their new León touring car. He was the only driver in the three-driver team to compete in all 10 meetings – his team-mates, double BTCC champion James Thompson and ex-DTM driver Darren Turner, shared the team's second Leon. After the first 3 meetings, he was a point behind Thompson and 3rd in the championship, but had two retirements in the races at Thruxton. After winning race 1 at Croft, race 2 was his 200th start, and he nearly won, but Matt Neal passed him with 2 laps to go. He won 2 out of the 3 races at Brands Hatch to keep his faint hopes of winning the BTCC in 2006 alive, but a poor qualifying run at Silverstone finally ended his hopes. He beat Colin Turkington to 2nd in the championship, meaning that he had then finished in each of the top 5 championship positions.

Winning the first two races of 2007 set the tone for a title battle with Fabrizio Giovanardi's Vauxhall. Giovanardi took the series lead at Knockhill but Plato retook it at Donington Park after fighting from 9th on the grid to come 5th in race 1 and then win race 2. He started race 3 from 9th (after spinning this position on the grid-reversal wheel) but fought through to take the lead from Mike Jordan, with some uncertainty over whether he had passed under a yellow flag. To ensure that he was not penalised, he allowed Jordan to repass him, before retaking the lead a lap later. The battle went to the final round, with Giovanardi winning by 3 points to take the championship, with Plato declaring that "Fabrizio beat us the right way. He is a very worthy champion and there were no shenanigans between me and him."

In 2008, the team switched to a diesel-powered León. The first win for a diesel car in the BTCC came in round 7 at Donington Park. Two wins at Snetterton helped him to close the gap on Giovanardi, but a mechanical failure in race 3 was a precursor to a similar problem in race 2 at Oulton Park, after winning race 1. These issues typified a season in which performance was not matched by reliability, despite the same cars being largely reliable in the World Touring Car Championship. Plato went into the final rounds at Brands Hatch still mathematically in with a chance of the title, but admitted that the large points difference between his and Giovanardi's made this unrealistic. Both he and Giovanardi had poor final rounds at Brands, allowing Mat Jackson to leapfrog Plato for 2nd overall in his privateer BMW.

RML Chevrolet (2009–2011)

Plato's plans for 2009 had been affected by SEAT's shock announcement to pull their factory team out of the BTCC at the end of the 2008 season. It was speculated that Plato was planning to take a sabbatical from racing to focus on his TV work. However, after holding talks over the off-season with West Surrey Racing and Tempus Sport, Plato decided to return to the BTCC in a privately entered RML Group Chevrolet Lacetti. After the first meeting, the team secured sponsorship from Silverline power tools and Auto Windscreens for the rest of the season, and raced under the Racing Silverline banner. At the final round of the season at Brands Hatch, Plato became only the second driver after Dan Eaves at Thruxton in 2005 to win all three races, the first of which he won by a then closest-ever BTCC winning margin of 0.015 seconds, ahead of Tom Chilton. He finished 2nd in the 2009 championship, 5 points behind champion Colin Turkington.

For 2010, RML became an official Chevrolet manufacturer team, racing the Cruze model that races in the World Touring Car Championship, with Plato as lead driver. Plato was a championship challenger immediately, with a double victory at Snetterton returning him to the championship lead. He dominated the 2nd half of the season and claimed the 2010 MSA Dunlop British Touring Car Championship by winning round 29 at Brands Hatch on 10 October 2010. His win was also his 60th, equalling Andy Rouse's BTCC record.

Plato remained with the same team in 2011 and won the first round of the season at Brands Hatch, setting a new BTCC record of 61 victories. He came 3rd in the Championship.

MG KX Momentum Racing (2012–2014)
In 2012 and 2013, he raced for the Triple Eight Race Engineering (United Kingdom) team in their MG KX Momentum Racing MG6 and came 3rd in the Championship in both years. In 2014, with a similar but differently-sponsored car (MG KX Clubcard Fuel Save) under the same team, he came 2nd in the Championship.

Team BMR (2015–2018)

On 17 February 2015, it was announced that Plato would be driving alongside Turkington, Aron Smith and Warren Scott for Team BMR during the 2015 BTCC season. He took 6 wins during the year but missed out on the title by four points.

In January 2016, it was announced that Team BMR would run four Subaru Levorgs for the season. A slow start saw Jason record a best finish of 13th at Brands Hatch. Once the team developed the Levorg into a race winning car, Plato took 9 podiums along with a win at Knockhill in his 500th race. He continued with the team in 2017 but a crash at the first round at Brands Hatch derailed his season before it had begun. Permanent damage was sustained to the chassis of his car that plagued him with grip and under steer issues for the majority of the season. Nevertheless, he still took four podium finishes, including another win at Knockhill, and finished the season in 12th place in the standings.

Plato remained with BMR Subaru for 2018, as the team switched from using a Mountune engine to a Swindon engine in an effort to resolve the reliability issues that had hampered Plato's campaign the previous year. However, the change in engine proved to have a disastrous effect on the car's performance. Plato failed to score a point in any of the first four race meetings of the season and his only visit to the podium that season came with a second place finish in the first race at Croft, as part of a Subaru 1-2. Plato would only score a further nine points all season after this, finishing in 27th place with a paltry 26 points.

Power Maxed Racing (2019–2021)
On 20 February 2019, it was announced that Plato would be switching to Power Maxed Racing, driving in the factory-backed Vauxhall Astra. He finished the championship in 7th place with a total of 237 points, with a win in the final race of the season.

For 2020, the team chose not to compete as a full time team, but retained Plato for 2021. 2021 saw the Vauxhall hampered by throttle linkage issues. Plato took one podium at the opening round at Thruxton, finishing the year in 14th place with 156 points.

BTC Racing (2022)
It was announced on 6 April 2022 that Plato would be joining BTC Racing for his 23rd and last season in the BTCC. He finished the year in 17th place, with a single podium at Snetterton.

Other racing
Plato competed in the Bathurst 1000 twice and the Sandown 500 once, but without any great success. His second attempt at Bathurst was with the Holden Racing Team and was driving with the late Peter Brock. Plato and Brock's race ended with Plato being involved in a crash which resulted in John Cleland's car rolling on to its roof.

In 1998, he took part in the Silverstone Rally Sprint, part of the British Rally Championship, driving a 3rd works Renault Megane F2. He finished 9th, with co-driver Andy Wilman, (former) presenter and executive producer on Top Gear.

During his 2005 BTCC campaign, he competed in four rounds of the World Touring Car Championship (WTCC) for SEAT Sport. He achieved a second-place finish in race 2 of his home round FIA WTCC Race of UK at Silverstone. He also won a race and finished second overall in the 2005 European Touring Car Cup.

Plato often competes in historic racing and is a regular at the Goodwood Revival and Members meeting and teamed up with celebrity chef James Martin in a Ford Prefect and with Craig Davies in a Corvette Stingray for the 2012 event.

Television career
Plato is a co-presenter for the Channel 5 British TV series Fifth Gear co-starring with Tiff Needell, Vicki Butler-Henderson and Jonny Smith. He previously co-presented Channel 4's motoring program 'Driven' alongside Mike Brewer, Penny Mallory and James May. Formerly with Tom Ford (presenter)  as a fellow presenter, Plato appeared opposite Ford for an episode of Ready Steady Cook UK. 

Plato was injured in a Caparo T1 supercar in October 2007 during filming for Fifth Gear at Bruntingthorpe proving ground. The car caught fire at an estimated 250 kilometres per hour (160 mph) and Plato described his injuries as follows: “The back of my neck is burnt and so are my face and hands. I obviously couldn’t take my hands off the steering wheel whilst braking and my right hand is more badly burnt than my left."He was taken from the scene by former BTCC driver Phil Bennett and after treatment at three hospitals, including Stoke Mandeville Hospital's specialist burns unit, Plato was able to compete in the following weekend's final race in the 2007 BTCC calendar. This incident was also mentioned on Top Gear, where Jeremy Clarkson called him a 'Baked Potato' after mispronouncing his name.

Plato presented the Sky One television program Mission Implausible where he and Tania Zaetta competed to perform three stunts over the course of each episode.

Book 
On 19 September 2019, Jason Plato released his first autobiography titled How Not to Be a Professional Racing Driver. It was published by Penguin Books Ltd.

Personal life
Plato was born in Oxford, Oxfordshire, England, and was educated at Chillingham Road Primary School and the King's School, Tynemouth. He is married to Sophie and they have two daughters, Bev and Moolaade.

Plato is also a qualified pilot, he owned a Piper Malibu Mirage to commute from his former home in Monaco.

Other ventures
Plato is a brand ambassador of Tesco Momentum 99 Fuel, Jigsaw24 and AMX Home Automation Systems. He runs a marketing agency, Brand Pilot Ltd. On 30 March, 2021, it was confirmed that Fuelling Around, the podcast that he co-hosts with Dave Vitty, was returning for a second series. The pair's motoring show held its first live show at Motorsport UK's new Bicester home on 23 September, 2021.

Racing record

Complete British Touring Car Championship results
(key) Races in bold indicate pole position (1 point awarded – 1997–2002 all races, 2003–present just in first race, 2000–2003 in class) Races in italics indicate fastest lap (1 point awarded – 2001–present all races, 2000–2003 in class) * signifies that driver lead race for at least one lap (1 point awarded – 1998–2002 just in feature races, 2003–present all races)

‡ Retired before 2nd start of race.

Complete World Touring Car Championship results
(key) (Races in bold indicate pole position) (Races in italics indicate fastest lap)

Complete V8 Supercar Championship results 
(key) (Races in bold indicate pole position) (Races in italics indicate fastest lap)

Complete Bathurst 1000 results

* Super Touring race

References

External links

JasonPlato.com (NB: Diverts to seatsportuk.co.uk, Sept 2009)
Official Profile at BTCC.net
Corporate SEAT Sport site
Sky One website for Mission Implausible
Complete BTCC results

1967 births
Living people
Sportspeople from Oxford
English racing drivers
British Formula Renault 2.0 drivers
British Formula Three Championship drivers
British Touring Car Championship drivers
British Touring Car Championship Champions
European Touring Car Cup drivers
World Touring Car Championship drivers
Supercars Championship drivers
English television presenters
English expatriates in Monaco
People educated at The King's School, Tynemouth
ASCAR drivers
Renault UK Clio Cup drivers
P1 Motorsport drivers
Cupra Racing drivers